The 2021 Howard Bison football team represented Howard University as a member of the Mid-Eastern Athletic Conference (MEAC) in the 2021 NCAA Division I FCS football season. The Bison, led by second-year head coach Larry Scott, played their home games at William H. Greene Stadium.

Schedule

References

Howard
Howard Bison football seasons
Howard Bison football